Annushka is a 1959 Soviet drama film directed by Boris Barnet.

Plot 
The film tells about a Soviet woman, who survived the loss of her husband as a result of the war, alone raised children.

Starring 
 Irina Skobtseva as Annushka
 Anastasiya Georgievskaya as Polina Sergeyevna 
 Boris Babochkin as Ivan Ivanovich
 Galina Tokareva	as Nina
 Lev Barashkov as Sasha
 Eduard Martsevich as Vovka
 Olga Aroseva as Vovka's mother
 Elena Korolyova as Granata
 Valentina Vladimirova as Nastya
 Stanislav Chekan	as russian soldier
 Lev Zolotukhin as  Pyotr Denisov		
 Yevgeny  Morgunov as speculator

References

External links 
 

1959 films
Soviet drama films
1950s Russian-language films
Mosfilm films
Films directed by Boris Barnet